The Civil and Military Gazette was a daily English-language newspaper founded in 1872 in British India. It was published from Lahore, Simla and Karachi, some times simultaneously, until its closure in 1963.

History

The Civil and Military Gazette was founded in Lahore and Simla in 1872. It was a merger of The Mofussilite in Calcutta, and the Lahore Chonicle and Indian Public Opinion and Panjab Times in Lahore.

The Lahore and Simla editions of the paper continued to be published concurrently until 1949, when the Simla branch was closed.

The Civil and Military Gazette began publishing in Karachi a week before its branch in Simla closed. However, the CMG in Karachi was very short-lived, the publication lasting a mere 4 years.

During the CMG'''s publication in Lahore, Simla, and Karachi, the frequency of publication changed thrice as follows:

Notable staff members

Rudyard Kipling
The Civil and Military Gazette was the workplace of renowned British author and poet, Rudyard Kipling. It was referred to by Kipling as his "mistress and most true love."

Kipling was assistant editor of the CMG, a job procured for him by his father, who was curator of the Lahore Museum, when it was decided that he lacked the academic ability to get into Oxford University on a scholarship.

When Kipling joined the staff at the Lahore CMG in 1882, the editor-in-chief was Stephen Wheeler. 1886 brought a change of editors at the newspaper. Kay Robinson, the new editor, allowed more creative freedom, and Kipling was asked to contribute short stories to the newspaper. His first collection of short stories, Plain Tales from the Hills, contained 28 stories that had initially found publication in the CMG.

Rudyard Kipling eventually left the Civil and Military Gazette in 1887, to move to its sister-newspaper in Allahabad, The Pioneer.

Mahbub Jamal Zahedi
The last editor of CMG was Abdul Hamid Sheikh, who wrote Lahore Notes under 'HS' in the Pakistan Times after the CMG shut down.
Mahbub Jamal Zahedi joined the Civil and Military Gazette'' in 1963, at a time when its last branch, situated in Lahore, was about to cease publication. He served there for only a few months, before he moved to Dawn in Karachi.

References

Daily newspapers published in India
Publications established in 1872
English-language newspapers published in India
English-language newspapers published in Pakistan
Publications disestablished in 1963
Mass media in Lahore
1872 establishments in India
Daily newspapers published in Pakistan